The 2nd Dragoon Regiment was a dragoon regiment of the Royal Danish Army, active from 1683 to 1910.

History
The regiment was established in 1683 as Løvendahls Dragoneskadron and finally disbanded 20 June 1910 in Odense as 2. Dragonregiment.

A part of Holstenske Lansenerregiment was amalgamated with the regiment on 1 July 1842.

Names of the regiment

References

Danish Army regiments
1683 establishments in Denmark
Military units and formations established in 1683